Astypalaia Island National Airport , also known as "Panaghia" Airport, is an airport on Astypalaia Island, Dodecanese, Greece. The facility is located nearby the village Analipsis, and approximately 12 km northeast of the city of Astypalaia.

Airlines and destinations
The following airlines operate regular scheduled and charter flights at stypalaia Island National Airport:

Statistics

History of the annual throughput of passengers:

See also
Transport in Greece

References

External links
HCAA airport website
Greek Airports Guide
HCAA Airport data

Airports in Greece
Buildings and structures in the South Aegean
Dodecanese